Clipper is the brand name of a type of refillable butane lighter, designed by Enric Sardà and owned by Flamagas S.A. since 1959.

The lighters are mostly produced in Barcelona (Spain), while others are manufactured in Chennai (India) and Shanghai (China). Clipper has a wide range of lighters, gas refills and other accessories. The first Clipper lighter was made in 1972, and now the worldwide level of production is around 450 million units a year, making it the second-largest lighter manufacturer in the world (behind BIC). 

The Clipper brand is a division of Flamagas S.A., which also distributes stationery and electronics for such brands as Casio and Daewoo. Flamagas S.A. is headed by Puig, and both companies are subsidiaries of the Exea Corporation.

Associations 
Some people associate the use of the Clipper lighter with stoners. This is due to its flint system, which smokers often used to pack self-rolling tobacco.

In popular culture

 British garage act The Streets used the Clipper lighter as its logo. The lighter (bearing the name of the artist) appears on all album covers bar the first album, which in fact featured a Swan lighter. Their merchandise includes branded Clipper lighters.
 The Artist Damien Hirst also used the images of the Clipper lighter in a series of artworks together with Silk Cut

References

External links
 Official Clipper website
 Official Flamagas website (manufacturer company)

Cigarette lighter brands
Manufacturing companies of Spain
Spanish brands
Cannabis culture